The 1990 Kremlin Cup was a men's tennis tournament played on indoor carpet courts. It was the 1st edition of the Kremlin Cup, and was part of the World Series of the 1990 ATP Tour. It took place at the Olympic Stadium in Moscow, Russia, from 5 November through 12 November 1990. Only men were involved in singles and doubles - it became a joint event in 1996.

Finals

Singles

 Andrei Cherkasov defeated  Tim Mayotte, 6–2, 6–1
 It was Cherkasov's first singles title of his career.

Doubles

 Hendrik Jan Davids /  Paul Haarhuis defeated  John Fitzgerald /  Anders Järryd, 6–4, 7–6
 It was Davids's 1st title of his career. It was Haarhuis's 1st title of his career.

References

External links
 Official website
 ITF tournament edition details

Kremlin Cup
Kremlin Cup
Kremlin Cup
Kremlin Cup
Kremlin Cup
1990 in Russian tennis